Christ the Redeemer Parish is a Catholic parish in Baku, Azerbaijan (Teymur Aliyev St., 69/b/1). It includes Christ the Redeemer Chapel, based in a private house purchased by Salesians, there is also a library. CRP maintains the Parish Social Ministry as well. Current parish priest is Father Slavko Shvigra. When the new building of the Church of the Immaculate Conception of the Blessed Virgin Mary was finished, the main church services have been transferred there.

Now the chapel is a service place of Salesians, who live in the same building.

References

External links
Catholic.az (official website, English version)

Roman Catholic churches in Azerbaijan
Churches in Baku